Inoke Tapa'atoutai is a Tongan international rugby league footballer who most recently played as a  for the Cronulla Sharks in the New South Wales Cup.

References

External links
 Narraweena profile
 http://forums.leagueunlimited.com/threads/round-15-teams.203025/

Living people
Montpellier Red Devils players
Rugby league props
Tonga national rugby league team players
Tongan rugby league players
Year of birth missing (living people)